Nostalgie Belgium, can refer to:
 Nostalgie Vlaanderen, the Flemish (Dutch) Belgian version of Nostalgie.
 Nostalgie Wallonie, the Walloon (French) Belgian version of Nostalgie.